Daniel Brosinski (born 17 July 1988) is a German professional footballer who plays as a right-back for  club Karlsruher SC.

Career
Brosinski was born in Karlsruhe. He played his first Bundesliga match for 1. FC Köln (which was his first fully professional match) on 21 February 2009 in a 2–1 away win against Bayern Munich. He scored 1. FC Köln's second goal.

Although he had signed for Greuther Fürth a two-year contract until 2015, after Fürth's failed to gain promotion in 2014, Brosinski stated his desire to play in the Bundesliga. On 3 July 2014, Fürth complied with his wishes and allowed him to join 1. FSV Mainz 05 for transfer believed to be about €1 million. He signed a four-year contract expiring June 2018. At Mainz he was planned to be the successor of Zdeněk Pospěch who left the club at the age of 35 and went back home to the Czech Republic.

On 3 January 2023, Brosinski signed for his hometown club Karlsruher SC on a contract until the end of the season.

Career statistics

References

External links
 

1988 births
Living people
Footballers from Karlsruhe
Association football midfielders
German footballers
Germany youth international footballers
Karlsruher SC II players
1. FC Köln players
1. FC Köln II players
SV Wehen Wiesbaden players
MSV Duisburg players
SpVgg Greuther Fürth players
1. FSV Mainz 05 players
Karlsruher SC players
Bundesliga players
2. Bundesliga players
3. Liga players
21st-century German people